is a Japanese politician and the current governor of Kumamoto Prefecture. He has been governor since 2008.

Ikuo Kabashima received a bachelor's and master's degrees in Animal Science and Agricultural Economics from the University of Nebraska. He received a Ph.D. in political economy from Harvard University, John F. Kennedy School of Government in 1979. He studied under Samuel P. Huntington and Sidney Verba in HKS.

Kabashima was an associate professor at the Institute of Policy and Planning Sciences of the University of Tsukuba from 1986 to 1991. He became a professor in 1991 and in 1996 was named dean of the Graduate School of International Political Economy. In 1997 he became a professor of law at the University of Tokyo.

References 

1947 births
Living people
People from Kumamoto Prefecture
University of Nebraska–Lincoln alumni
Harvard Kennedy School alumni
Academic staff of the University of Tokyo
Japanese political scientists
Governors of Kumamoto Prefecture
Academic staff of the University of Tsukuba